Lunar Magic is a level editor created by FuSoYa for Super Mario World that allows the user to edit and create custom graphics, blocks, sprites, levels, backgrounds, music, overworld maps, and full title screen and credits. The program is distributed as freeware and runs on Microsoft Windows and, through WINE, Linux.

History
According to FuSoYa, he started the development of Lunar Magic for the Super Nintendo Entertainment System game Super Mario World, in February 2000, with the first public release coming on September 24, 2000. FuSoYa, who coded the editor and reverse engineered the base game as a solo developer, also created Super Demo World as a way to showcase what the new editor was capable of creating.

New releases with improvements have regularly come over the years, with the most recent update coming on October 1, 2022, to version 3.33. As of February 2023, it remains the only publicly released level editor for Super Mario World.

Reception
Reception for Lunar Magic has been positive. Kotaku praised it, noting it was a "Cool level editor for Super Mario World" and stated "Lunar Magic is sure to revive the seemingly, never-flagging love for the ultimate side-scroller." Boing Boing thanked the editor's creator for making it. Simon Carless' 2005 book Gaming Hacks by O'Reilly Media describes it as "One of the most spectacular, fully formed level editor hacks of all time". 1UP.com stated that "This unprecedented editor allows for easy creation of brand new levels for Super Mario World." 

The website Super Mario World Central, or SMW Central, was created in 2006 and is mostly dedicated to showing off ROM hacks made using Lunar Magic.

See also
 Kaizo Mario World
 Super Mario Maker
 Super Mario Maker 2

References

External links 
FuSoYa's Niche
SMW Central

Video game level editors